Insteon  is a proprietary home automation (domotics) system that enables light switches, lights, thermostats, leak sensors, remote controls, motion sensors, and other electrically powered devices to interoperate through power lines, radio frequency (RF) communications, or both. It employed a dual-mesh networking topology in which all devices are peers and each device independently transmits, receives, confirm and repeats messages.  Like other home automation systems, it had been associated with the Internet of things.

In mid-April of 2022, the company appeared to have abruptly shut down.

Corporate history
Insteon-based products were launched in 2005 by Smartlabs, the company which holds the trademark for Insteon. A Smartlabs subsidiary, also named Insteon, was created to market the technology. In 2017, SmartLabs and the Insteon trademark were acquired by Richmond Capital Partners.

On April 16, 2022 reports emerged of users finding their Insteon Hubs offline. The company forums, web servers and API servers went offline. The company's CEO Rob Lilleness appeared to have scrubbed any references to Insteon from his LinkedIn page, and other employees also appeared to indicate on their LinkedIn profiles that their employment with the company ceased in April 2022.

In a community statement published on the Insteon.com website, Smartlabs has revealed that it has been looking for a parent company to purchase and continue developing the Insteon ecosystem following supply-chain issues during the COVID-19 pandemic. This sale failed to materialize in March 2022 and subsequently a financial services firm has been tasked with optimizing the assets of the company.

In October 2022, Insteon services were brought back by a group of customers who claim to have bought the company assets.

Protocol
Every message received by an Insteon compatible device undergoes error detection and correction and is then retransmitted to improve reliability. All devices retransmit the same message simultaneously so that message transmissions are synchronous to the powerline frequency, thus preserving the integrity of the message while strengthening the signal on the powerline and reducing RF dead zones. Insteon powerline messaging uses phase-shift keying. Insteon RF messaging uses frequency-shift keying.

Each message contains a two-bit "hops" field that is initialized to 3 by the originating node and decremented each time a node in the network repeats the message. Individual Insteon messages can also carry up to 14 bytes of arbitrary user data for custom applications.

Network topology
Insteon is an integrated dual-mesh (formerly referred to as "dual-band") network that combines wireless radio frequency (RF) and a building's existing electrical wiring. The electrical wiring becomes a backup transmission medium in the event of RF/wireless interference. Conversely, RF/wireless becomes a backup transmission medium in the event of powerline interference. As a peer-to-peer network, devices do not require network supervision, thus allowing optional operation without central controllers and routing tables.

Insteon devices can function without a central controller.  Additionally, they may be managed by a central controller to implement functions such as control via smartphones and tablets, control scheduling, event handling, and problem reporting via email or text messaging. A computer can be used as a central controller by connecting it to an Insteon USB/serial PowerLinc modem, which serves as a communication bridge between the computer and the Insteon device network.

Security
Insteon network security is maintained via linking control to ensure that users cannot create links that would allow them to control neighbors’ Insteon devices, and via encryption within extended Insteon messages for applications such as door locks and security applications, should those applications choose to implement encryption.

Insteon enforces linking control by requiring users to have physical possession of devices, or knowledge of their unique Insteon IDs in order to create links. Firmware in Insteon devices prohibits them from identifying themselves to other devices unless a user either physically presses a button on the device during the installation process or explicitly addresses the device via a central controller. Linking to a device by sending Insteon messages (e.g., from a central controller) requires knowledge of the address of the target Insteon device. As these addresses are unique for each device and assigned at the factory (and displayed on a printed label attached to each device), users must have physical access to the device to read the device address from the label and manually enter it when prompted during installation.

The security of Insteon RF devices was criticized in a DEF CON presentation in 2015.

Installation
Insteon devices are configured by applying a sequence of "taps" (button presses) to a pushbutton on each device to establish direct device-to-device links. Alternatively, a central controller may be used to configure devices.

Each Insteon device has its own unique identifier code, similar to a MAC address, and the technology allows directly linked devices to manage their identifiers.

Compatibility
Older Insteon chip sets manufactured by Smartlabs can transmit, receive, and respond to (but not repeat) X10 power line messages, thus enabling X10 networks to interoperate with Insteon.

In 2014, Insteon released apps for Windows 8 and Windows Phone, as part of an agreement with Microsoft to sell its kits at Microsoft Store locations. The Windows Phone also featured voice control via Cortana.

In 2015, voice control was added via compatibility with Amazon Echo.  That same year, Logitech announced that the remote for the Harmony Hub (a smart home hub) would support Insteon devices when deployed with an Insteon Hub.  Also in 2015, Insteon announced an initiative to integrate the Google-owned Nest learning thermostat with the Insteon Hub.

Insteon was one of two launch partners for Apple's HomeKit platform, with the HomeKit-enabled Insteon Hub Pro.  In 2015, Insteon announced support for the Apple Watch, allowing watch owners to control their home with an Insteon Hub.

References

External links
 
 Open Source Insteon USB device driver for Linux

Smart home hubs
Wireless sensor network
Mesh networking
IOS software
WatchOS software
Android (operating system) software
Windows Phone software
Power-line communication Internet access
2005 establishments